Empress Xuan may refer to:

Middle Empress Xuan ( 318), consort of Liu Cong (Emperor Zhaowu of Han Zhao)
Zhang Yao'er (506–570), wife of Chen Baxian (Emperor Wu of Chen)
Empress Dowager Chinu (died 574), mother of Yuwen Yong (Emperor Wu of Northern Zhou)